Xavier Vila Gazquez (born 8 March 1990) is a Spanish chess grandmaster (2011).

Biography
Xavier Vila Gazquez has repeatedly represented Spain at European Youth Chess Championships and World Youth Chess Championships, where he won European Youth Chess Championship in 2008 in the U18 age group. Four times he won medals in Spanish Youth Chess Championships in different age groups: gold (2006) and three silver (2004, 2005, 2007). In 2008, he represented Spain at the European Boys' U18 Team Chess Championship.

Xavier Vila Gazquez is winner of many international chess tournaments, including two Barcelona international chess tournaments (2002, 2004).

In 2007, he was awarded the FIDE International Master (IM) title and received the FIDE Grandmaster (GM) title four year later.

References

External links

Xavier Vila Gazquez chess games at 365Chess.com

1990 births
Living people
Sportspeople from Tarragona
Spanish chess players
Chess grandmasters